Laura Airport  is situated in Laura, Queensland, Australia.

See also

 Transport in Australia
 List of airports in Queensland

References

Airports in Queensland
Central West Queensland
Laura, Queensland